Riola Sardo, Arriora or Arriola in the Sardinian language, is a comune (municipality) in the Province of Oristano in the Italian region Sardinia, located about  northwest of Cagliari and about  north of Oristano.

Riola Sardo borders the following municipalities: Baratili San Pietro, Cabras, Narbolia, Nurachi, San Vero Milis.

Demographic evolution

References

Cities and towns in Sardinia